Albert Ernest Day (29 March 1894 – 15 May 1949) was an Australian rules footballer who played as fullback for the Essendon Football Club in the Victorian Football League (VFL).

He debuted late in 1914 and quickly established himself in the team, playing every game in 1915. After a two-year break due to World War I, Day returned in 1918 and again played every game that year. He was regarded as one of the leading fullbacks in the immediate post-war period, and represented Victoria in this position in 1920.

Sources
Holmesby, Russell & Main, Jim (2007). The Encyclopedia of AFL Footballers. 7th ed. Melbourne: Bas Publishing.

External links

1894 births
Australian rules footballers from Melbourne
Essendon Football Club players
1949 deaths
People from Brighton, Victoria